Harris Farm is a historic home and farm complex located at Walkersville, Frederick County, Maryland, United States. The main house was built in 1855, and is a three-story center plan house in predominantly late Greek Revival syle, with some Italianate elements.  The agricultural complex consists of a bank barn with an attached granary; a second frame barn that shares an animal yard with the bank barn; a row of frame outbuildings including a converted garage, a workshop, and a chicken house. There is also a drive-through double corn crib; and a frame pig pen from 1914. The 20th-century buildings consist of a frame poultry house, a dairy barn with milk house and two silos, and an octagonal chicken coop. A lime kiln is located on the edge of the property.  The property is preserved as part of the Walkersville Heritage Farm Park.

The Harris Farm was listed on the National Register of Historic Places in 1994.

References

External links
, including photo from 2006, at Maryland Historical Trust
Walkersville Heritage Farm Park website

Houses on the National Register of Historic Places in Maryland
Houses in Frederick County, Maryland
Houses completed in 1855
Greek Revival houses in Maryland
National Register of Historic Places in Frederick County, Maryland
Lime kilns in the United States